Brachyplatystoma is a genus of catfish from the family Pimelodidae. Brachyplatystoma are found in the Amazon and Orinoco basins, and other tropical freshwater and brackish habitats in South America. Some species are migratory. These fish are important as food fish and, to some extent, aquarium fish.

Taxonomy
Brachyplatystoma originates from Greek brachys, platys, and stoma, which mean short, flat, and mouth respectively. This genus was described in 1862 by Pieter Bleeker. The type species is B. vaillantii. The subgenus Malacobagrus is applied to B. capapretum, B. filamentosum, B. rousseauxii, and the extinct species B. promagdalena, which only is known from fossil remains.

Brachyplatystoma and its monotypic sister group Platynematichthys are the only genera in the tribe Brachyplatystomatini. These two genera are characterized by two synapomorphies; these include a gas bladder divided into an anterior portion and a triangular posterior portion, as well as a ventral crest under the cleithrum, the main bone supporting the pectoral fins.

The genus Brachyplatystoma was previously not monophyletic; to correct this, the genera Merodontotus and Goslinia are now both included under Brachyplatysoma. Furthermore, a new species was described in 2005, which brings the species count to seven extant species. B. capapretum is sister to B. filamentosum.

B. flavicans is not actually a species of Brachyplatystoma; this name is a commonly used synonym of Zungaro zungaro.

Anatomy and appearance
Brachyplatystoma all exhibit long maxillary barbels that extend past the dorsal fin in all species, but may even extend to the caudal fin. The caudal fin of adult Brachyplatystoma fish is moderately to deeply forked. Brachyplatystoma have specialized pelagic young with greatly elongated barbels and fin filaments, and strongly ornamented pectoral spines.

This genus is characterized by two synapomorphies. One of these is modified jaw muscles. The other, more obvious trait, is only found in juveniles and subadults, in which the upper and lower rays of the caudal fin are extended into long filaments. B. vaillantii is the sister species to all other Brachyplatystoma, marked by differences in the skull, jaw, and other bones. The subgenus Malacobagrus is characterized by their derived lateral line, Weberian apparatus, a subquadrangular gill cover (as opposed to triangular in other species), and pectoral spine.

As mentioned, one of the characteristics of this genus are extended caudal fin filaments and very long barbels on younger fish. In most of the species these filaments are not as elongated in adults, though they are retained in B. tigrinum, B. juruense, and B. platynemum, and the filaments are often severed by other fish or in accidents. Many Brachyplatystoma exhibit countershading, in which the dorsal surface is darker, and then fades to a lighter belly. In most species, this is consistent throughout life, though there are some exceptions. Juvenile B. capapretum and B. filamentosum exhibit dorsal and lateral spots which mostly disappear in the adult form. Juvenile B. juruense and B. tigrinum exhibit lateral spots that expand to form vertical stripes as the fish matures.

B. capapretum, described in 2005, was previously misidentified as B. filamentosum. These two species are closely related. However, these species differ in premaxillary dentition, juvenile and adult coloration, and adult maxillary barbel length and caudal fin shape. These two species exhibit spotted juvenile stages, though in B. capapretum these spots are much larger than the eye, while in B. filamentosum these spots are about the same size as the eye. Also, the cross section of the caudal peduncle is rounded in these two species, as opposed to a deeper, thinner cross section in other Brachyplatystoma species. The adult B. capapretum has a very dark or even black dorsum (its species name is derived from Portuguese which means black cape), as opposed to the lighter dorsal surface of B. filamentosum.

B. filamentosum and B. rousseauxii have a mysterious "milk" gland at the anterior upper part of their pectoral fins. Its function is unknown, but in Colombia this fish is known as lechero, which means milkman.

The world record recognized by IGFA for Brachyplatystoma filamentosum belongs to the Brazilian, Jorge Masullo de Aguiar with 155 kg.

Distribution and habitat
Fish of this genus are found in the Amazon, Orinoco, and The Guyanas in South America. The genus does not occur west or north of the Andes or in the Venezuelan Coastal Range. These fish generally inhabit areas that have a soft substrate, such as mud or sand. The fossil catfish B. promagdalena has been found in Colombia in an area now drained by the Magdalena River, where Brachyplatystoma species are currently absent; during the Miocene, this area had been drained by the Amazon and Orinoco system.

Ecology
These fish are mainly piscivorous. Stomach contents of B. filamentosum have been claimed to sometimes contain monkeys and it may even prey on humans.

Some of the species of Brachyplatystoma migrate long distances for reproduction. This is known in B. vaillantii, B. platynemum, and B. rousseauxii, but data about the migratory habits of other species are scant. This migration is associated with white-water rivers, as black water does not contain enough food for migrating Pimelodids. Maturation is timed to the increase in river level. Migration begins as the river level begins to rise with the coming of the rainy season. B. rousseauxii has the longest reproductive migration of any freshwater fish; from the mouth of the Amazon, migration may stretch , a trip which may last five to six months, before they spawn in the western tributaries of the Amazon. It is hypothesized that B. rousseauxii is homing, that is, it will return to the tributary in which it was born. Before spawning, the stomachs of these fish are empty, due to high digestive efficiency.

The young are carried downstream until they reach estuaries. Juveniles and subadults are commonly found in these habitats. They may even live in brackish waters at this time. They will live in these estuaries and river mouths for about three years here before entering the lower reaches of the river. At this still immature stage, they may form groups or school. This is the first record of young, migratory fish in the Amazon basin.

Relationship to humans
Brachyplatystoma are important food fish. In the Amazon Basin, thousands of metric tons of fish from this genus are caught for both local consumption as well as exportation. These fish are usually caught with the use of longlines or drift nets. They are also captured by harpoon as well as ropes with large fish hooks at the end. B. filamentosum is a major fishery, and B. rousseauxii has become the most important species in the Amazon River basin. B. rousseauxii and B. vaillantii constitute a significant percentage of Amazonian food fish. Based on a review by IBAMA, B. vaillantii was by far the most caught fish by weight in the Brazilian Amazon in 1998, B. rousseauxii the fourth most caught and B. filamentosum the sixth (Semaprochilodus spp. second, Prochilodus nigricans third and Brycon spp. fifth). The flesh of Brachyplatystoma is considered to be of excellent quality.

Human activities are a concern in that they may disrupt these fishes. Dams may impede the migration of these fish both to and from their spawning sites. Gold prospecting may also frighten these large catfishes in the areas where they spawn. Deforestation can also affect the upriver spawning habitats. Because these fish may migrate back to their original tributary, overfishing in a certain area may reduce a whole genetic group. In some areas, catches have been diminishing due to overfishing. B. rousseauxii is known to be overfished, and this same situation may apply to other Brachyplatystoma. Catch rates of B. filamentosum have decreased drastically from 1977.

Conversely, there have been recorded incidents where large B. filamentosum have preyed on humans. In one account documented on the television series River Monsters, a local fisherman was found having been swallowed head-first up to his waist by one of these catfish, though neither the fish nor the fisherman survived the encounter.

In the aquarium
Brachyplatystoma are generally uncommon in the fishkeeping trade. The large size of many of these fish prohibit them from being maintained in anything but the largest of aquaria, or in public aquariums. B. tigrinum is a highly prized fish in the fishkeeping hobby, and is one of the most expensive fish in this family.

These fish should be kept in well-oxygenated aquarium with a high current. Due to their large size, the aquarium should also be spacious and any tankmates must be large enough not to be eaten. The aquarium should not be brightly lit, and hiding places should be available. Breeding is unreported in captivity. Due to the similarity between B. tigrinum and B. juruense, the latter is often known as the False Zebra Shovelnose or False Tigrinus (as B. tigrinum was previously known as Merodontotus tigrinus).

Species
There are currently seven recognized species in this genus (common name shown in second parentheses):

Subgenus Brachyplatystoma:
 Brachyplatystoma juruense (Boulenger, 1898) (Zebra catfish, Juruense catfish, Gold Zebra Pim, False Tigrinus)
 Brachyplatystoma platynemum Boulenger, 1898 (Slobbering catfish)
 Brachyplatystoma tigrinum (Britski, 1981) (Tigerstriped catfish, Zebra shovelnose, Royal tiger shovelnose)
 Brachyplatystoma vaillantii (Valenciennes, 1840) (Laulao catfish, Piramutaba)
 Subgenus Malacobagrus
 Brachyplatystoma capapretum Lundberg & Akama, 2005
 Brachyplatystoma filamentosum (Lichtenstein, 1819) (Kumakuma, Piraíba, Filhote)
 Brachyplatystoma rousseauxii (Castelnau, 1855) (Gilded Catfish, Dourada (litt. golden in Portuguese. A name also used for several other unrelated species, e.g. Sparus aurata))

One fossil species is known:
 †Brachyplatystoma promagdalena Lundberg, 2005 – only known from fossils of Miocene origin.

References

External links
 Richter, Enrico: Groß - größer - am größten: Raubwelse der Gattung Brachyplatystoma

Pimelodidae
Fish of South America
Fauna of the Amazon
Catfish genera
Taxa named by Pieter Bleeker
Freshwater fish genera